The 1997 Cork Junior Hurling Championship was the 100th staging of the Cork Junior Hurling Championship since its establishment by the Cork County Board in 1895. The championship began on 27 September 1997 and ended on 30 November 1997.

On 30 November 1997, Castlelyons won the championship after a 2-09 to 1-11 defeat of Courcey Rovers in the final at Páirc Uí Rinn. It remains their only championship title in the grade.

Qualification

The Cork Junior Hurling Championship featured seven teams in the final tournament. Over 70 teams contested the seven divisional championships with the seven respective champions qualifying for the county championship.

Results

Quarter-finals

Semi-finals

Final

Championship statistics

Top scorers

Top scorers overall

Top scorers in a single game

References

External links

 Junior Hurling County Championship 1991-2000

Cork Junior Hurling Championship
Cork Junior Hurling Championship